The Pacific Coast Gravity Meeting is a yearly physics conference held to discuss topics in general relativity.

Summary

References

Physics conferences
Conferences in the United States
Gravity